Pecatonica High School may refer to:

 Pecatonica High School (Illinois), Pecatonica, Illinois
 Pecatonica High School (Wisconsin), Blanchardville, Wisconsin